Laton may mean:

Laton, California, a census designated place in California
Latopolis, an ancient city of Egypt
Laton (record label), an experimental electronic music label based in Austria, run by Franz Pomassl

It is in Spanish language which means Brass.